The Cook's Oracle may refer to:
A cookbook published in 1817 by William Kitchiner
A searchable database of cookbooks created by Barbara Ketcham Wheaton